Undulambia marconalis is a moth in the family Crambidae. It was described by William Schaus in 1924 and it is found in Peru.

References

Moths described in 1924
Musotiminae